{{Speciesbox
| image = Synbranchus marmoratus1.jpg
| image_caption = Marbled swamp eel
| status = LC
| status_system = IUCN3.1
| taxon = Synbranchus marmoratus
| authority = Bloch, 1795
| synonyms = 
Falconeria aptera Larrañaga, 1923
Falconeria pinnata Larrañaga, 1923
Symbranchus doringii Weyenbergh, 1877
Symbranchus hieronymi Weyenbergh, 1877
Symbranchus marmoratus Bloch, 1795 (misspelling)Symbranchus tigrinus Weyenbergh, 1877Synbranchus doringii Weyenbergh, 1877Synbranchus fuliginosus Ranzani, 1840Synbranchus hieronymi Weyenbergh, 1877Synbranchus immaculatus Bloch, 1795Synbranchus mercedarius Weyenbergh, 1877Synbranchus pardalis Valenciennes, 1836Synbranchus tigrinus Weyenbergh, 1877Synbranchus vittatus Castelnau, 1855Unibranchapertura lineata Lacepède, 1803
}}Synbranchus marmoratus'', the marbled swamp eel, neotropical swamp eel, marmorated swamp eel, mottled swamp eel, zange, or muçum is a species of swamp eel native to Central and South America, including the island of Trinidad and Grenada
.

Description
The dorsal and anal fins are vestigial and the paired pectoral and pelvic fins are missing altogether. The lining of the mouth is rich in blood vessels and provides an additional surface for gas exchange when the swamp eel breathes air.

Ecology
When in water, the marbled swamp eel is able to use its fully functional gills to breathe, whereas on land it can breathe with the lining of the mouth and pharynx. It is a nocturnal predator and feeds on any small prey in its environment such as frogs, tadpoles, fish, spiders, insects and other invertebrates. It moves through dense vegetation on river banks, searches shallow water areas for prey and descends into burrows to find concealed animals. When on land it lives in a burrow, and tunnels more deeply as the ground becomes drier so as to keep below the water table. In the laboratory, these eels have remained alive in drying-out burrows for over six months, moving about through the tunnels.

The marbled swamp eel is one of the few fish found up-river of large waterfalls and is a major predator of tadpoles in locations that other fish cannot access. It is a sequential hermaphrodite, and this is an advantage when it colonises new areas or encounters severe habitats. Juvenile fish can be either male, known as a primary male, or female. Secondary males can be told from primary males by examination of their gonads. The male digs a burrow and guards the nest.

References

Synbranchidae
Fish described in 1795